Icon: Number Ones (released as Best of Number Ones on the iTunes Store) is the third greatest hits album by American singer Janet Jackson. It was released on August 31, 2010 by Interscope Geffen A&M Records and Universal Music Enterprises as a part of the Icon album series, designed to feature "the greatest hits, signature tunes and fan favorites of the most popular artists in music history."

Critical reception

Stephen Thomas Erlewine gave the compilation a three and-a-half out of five star rating, commenting that it was "divided fairly" between her '80s and '90s hits, but also said that "Not every one of her big hits is here — 'The Pleasure Principle', 'Rhythm Nation', 'Love Will Never Do (Without You)', 'If', 'Got Til It's Gone' are all MIA — but this is a good sampler indicating the breadth and depth of Miss Janet’s work."

Track listings

Charts

References

2010 greatest hits albums
Interscope Records compilation albums
Universal Music Group compilation albums
Janet Jackson compilation albums
Albums produced by Jimmy Jam and Terry Lewis